Stilbops is a genus of parasitoid wasps belonging to the family Ichneumonidae.

The species of this genus are found in Europe and Japan.

Species:
 Stilbops acicularis Kasparyan, 1998 
 Stilbops asper (Schmiedeknecht, 1913)

References

Ichneumonidae
Ichneumonidae genera